John Charles Wright (19 August 1861 – 24 February 1933) was an Anglican Archbishop of Sydney, Australia, seen by some as responsible for reducing the influence of Anglo-Catholicism in the diocese.

Wright was born in Bolton, Lancashire, England, the son of the Reverend Joseph Farrall Wright (1827–1883), vicar of Christ Church, Bolton and co-founder of Bolton Wanderers Football Club, and his wife Harriet, née Swallow. J. C. Wright was educated at Manchester Grammar School and Merton College, Oxford, where he graduated with honours in 1884.

Wright was ordained deacon on 31 May 1885 and priest on 20 June 1886. After serving as a curate for eight years he became vicar of Ulverston in 1893. Two years later he transferred to St George's at Leeds, an important industrial parish, for nine years. In 1904 he was made a canon of Manchester Cathedral, rector of St George's, Hulme, and chaplain to the Bishop of Manchester. Early in 1909 he was appointed Archdeacon of Manchester.

Later in 1909, Wright accepted the archbishopric of Sydney and was consecrated at St Paul's Cathedral, London, on 24 August 1909. Wright was also Metropolitan of New South Wales and in April 1910 was elected Primate of Australia, the first occasion on which an election was held for this office. He was Ramsden preacher at Cambridge in 1913, and during World War I took great interest in work among the soldiers. The spread of Anglo-Catholic doctrines in Australia gave him some anxiety as he was Evangelical although of a moderate kind. Immediately before he came to Sydney he was "permanent chairman" of the Anglican Evangelical Group Movement - at that time an important liberal Evangelical society of clergy formed in 1906. Stephen Judd notes that he "believed in a much wider spectrum of opinion in the Anglican Church" and it is significant that he quickly appointed moderate Evangelicals Albert Talbot as Dean of Sydney and David Davies as principal of Moore College. About the year 1924 he had a serious illness and was henceforth compelled to go carefully. He was, however, an excellent chairman of synod during the long years of debate of the new constitution for the Church of England in Australia. Early in 1933 he took ill while visiting one of his daughters in New Zealand and died at Christchurch, following an operation, on 24 February 1933. He was buried in South Head cemetery. In 1903, Wright married Dorothy Margaret Isabella Fiennes, daughter of Colonel the Honourable Ivo de Vesci, who survived him with a son and three daughters. He was the author of Thoughts on Modern Church Life and Work, published in 1909.

It was Wright who banned the eucharistic vestments from use in churches in Sydney and has often and unfairly been criticised for this by Anglo-Catholics, but he conscientiously believed that the wearing of these was contrary to the law of the Church of England.

References

1861 births
1933 deaths
Anglican archbishops of Sydney
Australian people of English descent
Primates of the Anglican Church of Australia
Archdeacons of Manchester
People educated at Manchester Grammar School
Officers of the Order of St John
Alumni of Merton College, Oxford
People from Bolton
Evangelical Anglican bishops